Baptized in Filth is the fourth studio album by American Christian deathcore band Impending Doom. It was released on March 13, 2012 through the eOne Music label. The lead single released for the album is "For the Wicked", which had a music video produced for it. A music video for the song "Murderer" was released by the band in support of the album, and lastly, the band released the video for the song "Deceiver" on June 26, 2012.

The band played on the Metal Alliance Tour 2012 alongside DevilDriver, The Faceless, Dying Fetus, Job for a Cowboy and 3 Inches of Blood.

The album was produced by Andreas Magnussen who produced albums for (The Black Dahlia Murder and The Famine) and mixed by Machine who has previously worked with (Suicide Silence, Demon Hunter and Lamb of God). It is the last album by the band to feature guitarist Cory Johnson before his firing from the band in June 2012.

Background
The concept of the album, explained by bassist David Sittig:

Track listing

Personnel
Impending Doom
 Brook Reeves – vocals
 Cory Johnson – guitars
 David Sittig – bass
 Brandon Trahan – drums

Additional musicians
 Ryan Clark – guest vocals on "My Light Unseen"

Additional personnel
 Andreas Magnussen – production, engineering
 Alan Douches – mastering

References

2012 albums
Impending Doom albums
E1 Music albums